Üçtəpə (also, Uchtepe) is a village and municipality in the Goygol Rayon of Azerbaijan.  It has a population of 2,535.  The municipality consists of the villages of Üçtəpə and Firuzabad.

References 

Populated places in Goygol District